Michael A. Kostiuk (August 1, 1919 – July 26, 2015) was a Canadian-born gridiron football player who was an offensive tackle in the National Football League (NFL).

Personal life
Kostiuk was born in Krydor, Saskatchewan, Canada. He grew up in Hamtramck, Michigan, United States, a community mainly of Polish immigrants and their children but with some other Ukrainins, adjacent to Detroit after his family moved from Canada when he was 5. He died of heart failure in 2015 in Sterling Heights, Michigan. He was the oldest living Detroit Lion when he died.

Football
Kostiuk attended Hamtramck High School from 1934–1937, where he made All-City in 1935 and 1936, Detroit Tech from 1937-1940 on a football scholarship. In 1939, he earned a position on the Little All-American Team. The players on this elite team were chosen from Class B colleges throughout the country. He left Detroit Tech in 1941 to play for the Cleveland Rams. In 1942 he entered the United States Army and continued his football career there, making the Armed Forces All-Star team in 1943.

After leaving the Army in 1945, he signed with the Detroit Lions. In 1946 he joined the Buffalo Bisons. He played a total of seven National Football League games with the Detroit Lions and two All-America Football Conference games with the Buffalo Bisons and one with the Cleveland Rams. On November 6, 1986, he was inducted into the Hamtramck High School Sports Hall of Fame.

References

1919 births
2015 deaths
Canadian emigrants to the United States
American people of Ukrainian descent
Canadian people of Ukrainian descent
Gridiron football people from Saskatchewan
American football offensive linemen
Detroit Lions players
Buffalo Bisons (AAFC) players
Detroit Institute of Technology alumni
Cleveland Rams players
People from Hamtramck, Michigan
United States Army personnel of World War II
Canadian players of American football
Players of American football from Michigan